Daniel Cruger (December 22, 1780 – July 12, 1843) was an American newspaper publisher, lawyer and politician who served as a United States representative from New York.

Early and family life
Daniel Cruger was born in Sunbury, Northumberland County, Pennsylvania on December 22, 1780. He was the son of Daniel Cruger, Sr. and Elizabeth (née Wheaton) Cruger. He graduated from Georgetown University in 1802. He married twice. His first wife, Hannah (née Clement) Cruger, died in 1831. His second wife, Lydia Boggs Shepherd, was the wealthy widow of Moses Sheperd, a relation of the prominent Virginia Duke Family, who was a man contractor of the National Road. They married on July 16, 1833 in Ohio County, Virginia (now West Virginia).

Early career and military service
Cruger learned the printer's trade, and published the Owego Democrat in Owego, New York. He studied law, was admitted to the bar in 1805, and commenced practice in Bath, New York. Cruger served as a major in the War of 1812.

Political career
He was a member from Allegany and Steuben Counties of the New York State Assembly from 1814 to 1816, and again from Steuben County in 1826. Cruger served as Speaker during 1816.

Cruger was elected as a Democratic-Republican to the Fifteenth Congress, and served from March 4, 1817 to March 3, 1819.

He was District Attorney of the Seventh District of New York from 1815 to 1818, and of Steuben County, New York from 1818 to 1821. Afterwards he resumed the practice of law.

Daniel Cruger is buried at the Stone Church Cemetery in Wheeling, West Virginia.

References

External links

 Political Graveyard

1780 births
1843 deaths
Members of the New York State Assembly
Speakers of the New York State Assembly
People from Sunbury, Pennsylvania
Steuben County district attorneys
19th-century American newspaper editors
United States Army officers
Democratic-Republican Party members of the United States House of Representatives from New York (state)
People from Owego, New York
People from Steuben County, New York
19th-century American politicians
Journalists from New York (state)
Military personnel from Pennsylvania